Paul Lassenius Kramp (28 January 1887 – 13 July 1975) was a Danish marine biologist. He is best known for his extensive monographs on jellyfish., Several marine taxa have been named in his honor.

Eponymous taxa
Aequorea krampi Bouillon, 1984
Amphinema krampi Russell, 1956
Calycopsis krampi Petersen, 1957
Convexella krampi (Madsen, 1956)
Escharina krampi Marcus, 1938
Eutima krampi Guo, Xu & Huang, 2008
Krampella Russell, 1957
Krampia Ditlevsen, 1921
Mohnia (Tacita) krampi (Thorson, 1951)
Ransonia krampi (Ranson, 1932)
Tomopteris krampi Wesenberg-Lund, 1936

References

Danish marine biologists
20th-century Danish zoologists
1887 births
1975 deaths